Azochis rufifrontalis is a moth in the family Crambidae. It is found on Saint Vincent and Saint Lucia.

References

Moths described in 1895
Spilomelinae
Moths of the Caribbean